This is a list of commanders of the US 2nd Infantry Division of the United States Army.

Division Commanders

Division Command Sergeants Major (CSMs)

References 

Lists of United States military unit commanders
United States Army officers
Infantry divisions of the United States Army